A Northern Affair is a 2014 Ghanaian-Nigerian romantic drama film directed by Leila Djansi, and starring John Dumelo, Joselyn Dumas & Kofi Adjorlolo. It won the Africa Movie Academy Award for Best Production Design at the 10th Africa Movie Academy Awards.

Plot
The romantic relationship between nurse Esaba Jomo (Joselyn Dumas) and Dr Manuel Quagraine (John Dumelo), who work together in a clinic in a remote fishing village, is threatened when their secrets are revealed.

Cast
John Dumelo as Manuel Quagraine
Joselyn Dumas as Esaba Jomo
Kofi Adjorlolo
Jon Germain
Randall Obeng Sakyi
Eddie Coffie
Ben Torto
Beverly Afaglo
Irene Asante
Maame Dufie Boateng
Gifty Temeng
Edith Nuong Faalong

Reception
Nollywood Reinvented praised the directing, production, story and originality of the film.  It currently has a 46% rating on the site.

References

2014 films
Ghanaian drama films
2014 romantic drama films
Best Production Design Africa Movie Academy Award winners
Nigerian romantic drama films
2010s English-language films
English-language Ghanaian films
English-language Nigerian films
Films directed by Leila Djansi